Southern Precinct, formerly township, is Congressional Township 10 South, Range 2 East of the Third Principal Meridian located in Williamson County, Illinois. Its name is generic as there have never been any large communities or trade centers within it, though it is home to Pulley's Mill. The most well-known institution that lies within the precinct is the United States Penitentiary, Marion, which lies in the north-central part of the precinct. The Lake of Egypt Dam is also located in the Precinct, as is the northwestern part of the lake itself. The 2010 census reported a population of 3,273 inhabitants in Southern Precinct. The nearest city is Marion, Illinois, not far to its north-northeast.

References

Townships in Williamson County, Illinois
Precincts in Illinois